James Nelson Burnes (August 22, 1827 – January 23, 1889) was a U.S. Representative from Missouri.

Born in Marion County, Indiana, Burnes moved with his parents to Platte County, Missouri, in 1837.
He attended the common schools.
He graduated from the Harvard Law School in 1853.
He was admitted to the bar and commenced practice in Missouri.
Attorney of the district of Missouri in 1856.
He served as judge of the court of common pleas in 1868–1872.
He engaged in banking and the construction of railroads.
He served as president of the Missouri Valley Railroad Co..
Principal owner and president of the St. Joseph Waterworks Co..

Burnes was elected as a Democrat to the Forty-eighth, Forty-ninth, and Fiftieth Congresses and served from March 4, 1883, until his death.
James N. Burnes had been reelected to the Fifty-first Congress, but died in Washington, D.C., on January 23, 1889, before the commencement of the congressional term. Charles F. Booher replaced the deceased James N. Burnes, who was interred in Mount Mora Cemetery, St. Joseph, Buchanan County, Missouri.

See also
List of United States Congress members who died in office (1790–1899)

References

1827 births
1889 deaths
Harvard Law School alumni
Missouri state court judges
Democratic Party members of the United States House of Representatives from Missouri
19th-century American politicians
19th-century American judges